This is a list of holidays in Kuwait.  Some dates given are according to the solar Gregorian calendar widely used internationally and some dates are according to the lunar Islamic calendar.

References 

Kuwaiti culture
Society of Kuwait
Kuwait
Kuwait